The black garden ant (Lasius niger), also known as the common black ant, is a formicine ant, the type species of the subgenus Lasius, which is found across Europe and in some parts of North America, South America, Asia and Australasia. The European species was split into two species; L. niger, which are found in open areas; and L. platythorax, which is found in forest habitats. It is monogynous, meaning colonies contain a single queen.

Lasius niger colonies normally range from 4,000 to 7,000 workers, but can reach 40,000 in rare cases, but. A Lasius niger queen can live for up to 29 years the longest recorded lifespan for any eusocial insect. Lasius niger queens in the early stages of founding can have two to three other queens in the nest. They will tolerate each other until the first workers come, then it is most likely they will fight until one queen remains. Under laboratory conditions, workers can live at least 4 years.

Lasius niger is host to a number of temporary social parasites of the Lasius mixtus group including Lasius mixtus and Lasius umbratus.

Appearance

Life cycle

Mating flights
Ants mate on the wing, so "flying ants" are alates (reproductive individuals), which includes males and gynes (virgin queens). The mating (or nuptial) flights of Lasius niger usually occur around June to September throughout the species' range; in North America flights usually occur during the autumn, whereas in Europe they generally take place during the hot summer months of July and August. Flights can contain thousands of winged males and females.

Disparities between local weather conditions can cause nuptial flights to be out of phase amongst widespread populations of L. niger. During long-lasting, hot summers, flights can take place simultaneously across the country, but overcast weather with local patches of sunshine results in a far less synchronized emergence of alates.

Once the queens have mated they will land and discard their wings and begin to find a suitable place to dig a tunnel. Meanwhile, males generally only live for a day or two after the mating flights and will then die.

New nest
After removing her wings, a queen will move quickly to find moist ground, then start digging a tunnel. Once the tunnel has been completed, the queen will block the entrance and retreat to the bottom. Subsequently, she will dig out a small chamber. This will serve as the claustral chamber of the new colony. Generally, a queen will begin to lay eggs immediately after the construction of the chamber, and the eggs will hatch after 8–10 weeks. Until the eggs hatch and the larvae grow to maturity, a Lasius niger queen will not eat, relying on the protein of her wing muscles to be broken down and digested. In some cases, a Lasius niger queen may eat her own eggs in order to survive.

Egg to ant

Lasius niger, like other ants, have four stages of development: egg, larva, pupa, and adult. Lasius niger lay tiny, white, kidney-shaped eggs with a smooth sticky surface which helps them to be carried in a group instead of one by one. After hatching Lasius niger proceed onto the larva stage resembling tiny maggots. The larvae need to be fed by the queen (or workers in the case of an established colony) if they are to mature; as they feed the larvae grow, shedding their skin, doing so usually three times in total. With each molt, the larvae grow hooked hairs which allow them to be carried in groups. When Lasius niger larvae reach the last molt they are generally too big to be carried as part of a group and so are carried individually. Once the larva grows big enough it spins a cocoon around itself. To aid this process a queen (or workers) may bury the larva so that it can spin its cocoon undisturbed, and begin a process of metamorphosis. Once the process is complete the Lasius niger worker emerges from the cocoon. At this stage, the callow worker is completely white but will darken over the course of an hour until it has turned black.

Colony established
The first worker ants that emerge are very small compared to later generations. At this point the workers immediately begin to expand the nest and care for the queen and brood; they eventually remove the seal from the entrance to the nest and begin to forage above ground. This is a critical time for the colony as they need to gather food quickly to support future growth and particularly to feed the starved queen, who would have lost around 50% of her body weight. From this point on the queen's egg laying output will increase significantly, becoming the queen's sole function. The later generations of worker ants will be bigger, stronger and more aggressive because there is more nutrition for them at the larval stage. The initial brood being fed only by the scarce resources available to a queen will be much smaller than brood supported by a team of foraging and nursing workers. Provided workers are able to find food, at this stage the colony will see an exponential rise in population. After several years, once the colony is well established, the queen will lay eggs that will become queens and males. Black ants often make large nests with extensive tunnel connections.

Quarantine behavior
When building their colony, the ants structure it so as to inhibit the transmission of different contagions. Different communities within the colony are segregated by a limited number of connective nodes, allowing for greater protection of vulnerable hive members, such as larvae and pupae, and the queen.

Additionally, individual infected ants have been observed as spending more time foraging outside of the hive, venturing farther than other ants, and limiting their interactions once within the hive again.

Long-lived queens
Although worker ants live for a couple of months, queens typically survive for almost 15 years but there have been instances of queens living up to 29 years, the longest recorded lifespan for any eusocial insect. Understanding the basis for the greater longevity of queens has a bearing on the general unsolved problem in biology of the causes of aging. In the study of long-lived queen ants it was found that queens have a higher expression than genetically identical workers of genes involved in processing damaged macromolecules.  Genes with higher expression included those that are necessary for repair of DNA damage (see DNA damage theory of aging) and genes involved in proteasome-mediated, ubiquitin-dependent, protein catabolic processes.

Mutualisms

Lasius niger removes predators such as ladybirds from the vicinity of black bean aphid thus keeping their "milch cows" safe. On a test plot of field beans (Vicia faba), plants without black bean aphids yielded an average of 56 seeds per plant, those with aphids and no ants yielded 17 seeds, and those with both ants and aphids averaged eight seeds per plant. Vicia faba also produces extrafloral nectaries that Lasius niger can feed from directly.

The Plebejus argus butterfly lays eggs near nests of L. niger, forming a mutualistic relationship. This mutualistic relationship benefits the adult butterfly by reducing the need for parental investment. Once the eggs hatch, the ants chaperone the larvae, averting the attacks of predatory organisms like wasps and spiders as well as parasites. In return, the ants receive a saccharine secretion fortified with amino acids from an eversible gland on the larvae's back. As first instar larvae prepare to pupate, the ants carry the larvae into their nests. Once the larvae become pupae, the ants continue to provide protection against predation and parasitism. The butterfly leaves the nest when it emerges in June.

References

External links

Antkeepers has an article on Lasius niger
Myrm's Ant Colonies, including Lasius niger
The Kurt Kuene Antpage: Kurt Kuene shows how he keeps Lasius niger. With many pictures

Lasius
Hymenoptera of Asia
Hymenoptera of Europe
Hymenoptera of North America
Ants described in 1758
Taxa named by Carl Linnaeus